Lucca is a city in Italy.

Lucca may also refer to:
 Lucca (dog), United States Marine Corps service dog 
 Lucca Allen (born 2002), Irish racing driver
 Lucca (footballer), Brazilian footballer
Lucca Ashtear, a videogame character from Chrono Trigger
Republic of Lucca, a historic state of Italy

See also
 Luca (disambiguation)